"No Long Talk" is a song by Canadian rapper Drake featuring English rapper Giggs from his album, More Life (2017).

Charts

Certifications

References

2017 songs
Drake (musician) songs
Songs written by Drake (musician)
Songs written by Giggs (rapper)
Songs written by Murda Beatz
Songs written by Tim Gomringer
Songs written by Kevin Gomringer